Canon Emani Sambayya (1905–1972) was an Anglican Priest, who was born in Bodipalem in Guntur District, Andhra Pradesh. He has been described as an "eloquent speaker and a gifted writer."

Early life and education
Emani Sambayya was born in Bodipalem in Andhra Pradesh on 25 July 1905.

Graduate studies
In 1928, Emani began pursuing theological studies at the United Theological College, Bengaluru earning a graduate degree (BD) in 1932.

Post-graduate studies
Sambayya also enrolled for a post-graduate degree in MA under the University of Calcutta in 1932 completing it by 1935.

In 1938, Sambayya went to the Westcott House, Cambridge, for a diploma course.

In 1949, Sambayya was sent to the Union Theological Seminary in the City of New York for post-graduate studies in Moral Theology. In the continuing year, he was awarded an S.T.M. Sambayya's post-graduate dissertation was entitled The Eucharistic doctrine of Richard Hooker and Herbert Throndike

Contribution
Emani Sambayya first served as the Secretary of the Student Christian Movement and was based in Allahabad from 1935 to 1938.

In 1939, he was Deacon at Christ Church, Byculla. In the succeeding year, he was ordained as a Minister of the Anglican Church in India.

Anglicanism
Emani Sambayya, although baptised into Methodism, chose to get ordained as an Anglican Priest. In Anglicanism, he felt a sense of togetherness as it was a mix of Catholic and Reformed traditions. Kevin Ward in A History of Global Anglicanism mentions this particular aspect which Sambayya endorsed.

Inspired by Anglicanism, Sambayya wrote The Genius of the Anglican Communion<ref>Emani Sambayya, The Genius of Anglican Communion in E. R. Morgan and Roger Lloyd (Eds.), The Mission of the Anglican Communion, London, SPCK and SPG, 1948. pp. 18–29. Cited by Kevin Ward, A History of Global Anglicanism, Cambridge University Press, 2006.</ref> in 1948.

Theological education
From 1941 through 1968, Sambayya taught Theology at Bishop's College, Kolkata. He was first made a Lecturer in 1941 replacing Rev. John William Sadiq. In 1949, he was sent to the Union Theological Seminary in the city of New York for post-graduate studies in Moral Theology.

Immediately after his return from New York, Sambayya was made the Vice-Principal in place of Canon Manuel. From 1959 through 1968 he was Principal of Bishop's College, Kolkata.

During the period at Bishop's College, Sambayya's articles began appearing in the Indian Journal of Theology.Articles Touching the Untouchables.
 The Christian Message and the Non-Christian Religions.Books''
 The Eucharistic Doctrine of Richard Hooker and Herbert Throndike (1950).
 Faith and Conduct: An Introduction to Moral Theology, Christian Students Library, Chennai, 1965.

Senate of Serampore
India's first University, the Senate of Serampore College (University) in West Bengal conferred upon Emani Sambayya an honorary doctorate in 1961

Emani Sambayya also served as the President of the Senate of Serampore College (University) in 1968.

Retirement and death
In 1972, the Calcutta Municipal Gazette reported that Sambayya died while living in his residence in Bengaluru.

See also
 Rev. Dr. B. V. Subbamma
 Rev. Yisu Das Tiwari
 Bishop N. D. Ananda Rao Samuel
 Rev. Fr. Dr. D. S. Amalorpavadass
 Bishop Victor Premasagar

References

Further reading
 
 
 

1907 births
1972 deaths
Indian Christian theologians
Telugu people
Indian Anglican priests
People from Guntur district
Christian clergy from Andhra Pradesh
Converts to Anglicanism from Methodism
Senate of Serampore College (University) alumni
University of Calcutta alumni
Union Theological Seminary (New York City) alumni
Academic staff of the Senate of Serampore College (University)